Epicephala (leafflower moths) is a genus of moths in the family Gracillariidae.

Epicephala is of note in the fields of pollination biology and coevolution because many species in this genus are pollinators of plants in the genera Glochidion, Phyllanthus, and Breynia (Phyllanthaceae). These pollinating Epicephala actively pollinate the flowers of their host plants—thereby ensuring that the plants may produce viable seeds—but also lay eggs in the flowers' ovaries, where their larvae consume a subset of the developing seeds as nourishment. This relationship is similar to other specialized pollinating seed-predation mutualisms such as those between figs and fig wasps and yuccas and yucca moths.

Other species of Epicephala consume the seeds of species of Phyllanthus or Flueggea (Phyllanthaceae) as larvae, but do not pollinate their host plants as adults. At least some of these species have evolved from pollinating ancestors.

Species
Epicephala acrobaphes (Turner, 1900)
Epicephala acrocarpa Meyrick, 1927
Epicephala albifrons (Stainton, 1859)
Epicephala albistriatella (Turner, 1894)
Epicephala ancistropis Meyrick, 1935
Epicephala ancylopa Meyrick, 1918
Epicephala angustisaccula Li, 2015
Epicephala anthophilia Kawakita A, Kato M, 2016
Epicephala australis (Turner, 1896)
Epicephala bathrobaphes Turner, 1947
Epicephala bipollenella Zhang, Hu, Wang & Li, 2012
Epicephala bromias Meyrick, 1910
Epicephala calasiris Meyrick, 1908
Epicephala camurella Li, 2015
Epicephala colymbetella Meyrick, 1880
Epicephala corruptrix Kawakita A, Kato M, 2016
Epicephala domina Li, 2015
Epicephala epimicta (Turner, 1913)
Epicephala eriocarpa Zhang, Hu, Wang & Li, 2012
Epicephala euchalina Meyrick, 1922
Epicephala eugonia Turner, 1913
Epicephala exetastis Meyrick, 1908
Epicephala flagellata Meyrick, 1908
Epicephala frenata Meyrick, 1908
Epicephala haplodoxa Vári, 1961
Epicephala homostola Vári, 1961
Epicephala impolliniferens Li, 2015
Epicephala jansei Vári, 1961
Epicephala laeviclada Li, 2015
Epicephala lanceolaria Zhang, Hu, Wang & Li, 2012
Epicephala lanceolatella Kawakita A, Kato M, 2016
Epicephala lativalvaris Zhang, Hu, Wang & Li, 2012
Epicephala lomatographa Turner, 1913
Epicephala microcarpa Li, 2015
Epicephala mirivalvata Zhang, Hu, Wang & Li, 2012
Epicephala nephelodes Turner, 1913
Epicephala nudilingua Kawakita A, Kato M, 2016
Epicephala obovatella Kawakita A, Kato M, 2016
Epicephala orientale (Stainton, 1856)
Epicephala parasitica Kawakita A, Kato M, 2016
Epicephala pelopepla Vári, 1961
Epicephala periplecta (Diakonoff, 1955)
Epicephala perplexa Kawakita A, Kato M, 2016
Epicephala pyrrhogastra Meyrick, 1908
Epicephala relictella Kuznetzov, 1979
Epicephala scythropis Meyrick, 1930
Epicephala sphenitis Meyrick, 1931
Epicephala spinula Clarke, 1986
Epicephala spumosa Turner, 1947
Epicephala squamella Kuznetzov & Baryshnikova, 2001
Epicephala stauropa Meyrick, 1908
Epicephala strepsiploca Meyrick, 1918
Epicephala subtilis Meyrick, 1922
Epicephala tephrostola Vári, 1961
Epicephala tertiaria Li, 2015
Epicephala trigonophora (Turner, 1900)
Epicephala venenata Meyrick, 1935
Epicephala vermiformis Meyrick, 1936
Epicephala vitisidaea Zhang, Hu, Wang & Li, 2012
Epicephala zalosticha Turner, 1940

References

External links
Global Taxonomic Database of Gracillariidae (Lepidoptera)
Youtube video of an Epicephala lanceolaria pollinating a host Glochidion lanceolarium flower

 
Gracillariinae
Gracillarioidea genera